Endre Gerelyes (1935–1973) was a Hungarian novelist, short story writer and Hungarian literature professor at József Attila University in Szeged. His main works are Kövek között (1961), Töprengés az éjszakáról (1963), Ki vagy te? - Ábel! (1967), Isten veled, Lancelot! (1973), Tigris (1975). A selection of his short stories Kilenc perc (1985) and a collection of letters Tavaszi futás (1986) were published posthumously.

Hungarian male novelists
1935 births
1973 deaths
20th-century Hungarian novelists
20th-century Hungarian male writers